A banjo is a stringed instrument common in folk and popular music. 

Banjo may also refer to:

People

Nickname
 Terence Bannon (born 1967), Northern Ireland mountaineer and adventurer
 Bill Cornett (1890–c. 1959), American traditional folk singer, banjo player and politician
 Banjo Matthews (1932–1996), NASCAR driver, car owner and builder
 Barney McKenna (1939–2012), Irish musician and a founding member of The Dubliners, nicknamed "Banjo Barney"
 Banjo Paterson (1864–1941), Australian poet, journalist and author
 Ikey Robinson or Banjo Ikey (1904–1990), American banjoist and vocalist

Surname
 Ashley Banjo (born 1988), English street dancer, choreographer and actor
 Chris Banjo (born 1990), American National Football League player
 Jordan Banjo (born 1992), a British street dancer
 Kay Banjo (born 1992), American soccer player
 Tunji Banjo (fl. 1977–1982), Nigerian-Irish former footballer
 Victor Banjo (1930–1967), Nigerian Army colonel

Stage name
 Banjō Ginga, Japanese actor and voice actor Takashi Tanaka (born 1948)

Arts and entertainment

Films
 Banjo (1947 film), an American film directed by Richard Fleischer
 Banjo (2016 film), an Indian film
 the title character of Banjo the Woodpile Cat, a 1979 animated short

Music
 "Banjo" (song), by Rascal Flatts from the album Changed
 "The Banjo" (song), a 2014 single by Norwegian formation 3LOGY
 The Banjo (Gottschalk), an 1853 piano composition by Louis Moreau Gottschalk
 Banjo, of the Overflow, an 1892 poem by Australian poet Francis Kenna

Television
 "Banjo (Space Ghost Coast to Coast)", an episode of Space Ghost Coast to Coast

Fictional characters
 Haran Banjo, the main character in the 1978's Japanese anime series Daitarn 3
 Banjo, one of two protagonists in the Banjo-Kazooie video game series
 Mister Banjo, a recurring enemy of the Marvel Family
 Banjo Possum, a minor character in the Tiny Toon Adventures animated television series
 Dr. Banjo, a character from the Futurama episode "A Clockwork Origin"

Other uses
 Banjo (chocolate bar), a popular British chocolate bar during the 1970s
 Egg banjo, a type of fried egg sandwich
 Banjo (samba), a musical instrument
 Banjo (application), a surveillance app
 Banjo (signal), an obsolete railroad signalling device
 Banjo (wood lathe), a fixture on a wood-turning lathe
 Banjo enclosure, an archaeological feature
 Banjo Island, Bermuda
 Banjo Awards, presented by the National Book Council of Australia from 1974 to 1997 for both fiction and non-fiction
 Banjo ray, another name for the fiddler ray (Trygonorrhina)
 Battle of Banjo, a First World War battle in Africa
 Japanese gunboat Banjō, a warship of the early Imperial Japanese Navy
 A slang term for the Australian $10 note because one side has a picture of Banjo Paterson
 A dinosaur specimen of the genus Australovenator
 A typeface from French foundry Deberny & Peignot

See also
 Banjos banjos or banjofish, a species of fish

Lists of people by nickname